George Dockeray (1789–1857) was a British jockey and racehorse trainer.

His big race wins as a jockey included Lap-dog, the winner of the 1826 Epsom Derby, Chateau Margaux, the Ascot Gold Cup winner of the same year, and Green Mantle, the 1829 Oaks winner. He was also an early example of jockeys riding in races internationally, when, in the late 1820s, he and fellow jockey Sam Day, spent time race-riding in Brussels, Belgium.

After retiring as a jockey, he trained horses from stables in Church Street, Epsom, Surrey. His training success included the first-ever Grand National winner, Lottery, and three further National winners – Jerry (1840), Gaylad (1842) and Miss Mowbray (1852). He also trained flat horses, including Adine, winner of the Goodwood Stakes, Ebor Handicap and Yorkshire Oaks. In addition to this success, he had a reputation for being "as honest and faithful a trainer as any".

He died in Epsom in 1857.

Major wins (as jockey) 
 Great Britain
Ascot Gold Cup – Chateau Margaux (1826)
Epsom Derby – Lap-dog (1826)
Epsom Oaks – Green Mantle (1829)

Major wins (as trainer) 
 Great Britain
Grand National – Lottery (1839), Jerry (1840), Gaylad (1842), Miss Mowbray (1852)

References

External links 
George Dockeray's will at The National Archives

1857 deaths
British jockeys
British racehorse trainers